Kepler-635 (KOI-649, KIC 5613330) is an F7V star with an extrasolar planetary system discovered by the Kepler space telescope. The star was first thought to be variable, but later determined to be static.

Planetary system

The planetary system contains one confirmed planet and was first detected by the Kepler space telescope.

References

F-type main-sequence stars
649
Lyra (constellation)
J19190557+4048026